The White Mountain Central Railroad is a short heritage railway at Clark's Bears in Lincoln, New Hampshire. It is notable as being one of the few places in New England with regular steam locomotive operation, as well as being a very rare example of a purpose-built tourist railroad (like those found in amusement parks and theme parks) that uses standard-gauge track instead of narrow-gauge track.

Route
The entrance building to Clark's Bears (previously known as Clark's Trading Post) doubles as the train station. From there, the train leaves north through the park, and then past the small locomotive shop. The railroad crosses the Pemigewasset River on a covered bridge and then heads into a wooded area. In this section of the railroad, an actor playing a wild prospector named "the Wolfman" chases the train in a primitive car. Finally, the railroad goes under a ramp for Interstate 93 and terminates.

Schedule and fare
The railroad operates whenever Clark's Bears is open, between late May and early October. There are several round trips per day, depending on the park's operating hours. Each trip is 30 minutes long, and the fare is included in the Clark's Bears admission price.

History
Construction on the railroad began in 1955. The first train ride was on July 30, 1958.

The railroad includes a 1904 Howe truss covered bridge that was originally located in East Montpelier, Vermont, where it spanned the Winooski River and carried trains for the Montpelier and Barre Railroad. The bridge was purchased by the owners of Clark's Trading Post and dismantled in 1964, then moved and reassembled to span the Pemigewasset River near the Trading Post. During one weekend in September, Railroad Days are celebrated, with extra trains and special consists. That yearly event had stopped in 2014 and now operates every 5–10 years.

A listing of covered bridges maintained by the state of New Hampshire notes that Clark's bridge "appears to be the only Howe railroad bridge left in the world."

Locomotive roster

Station

The Clark's Bears station came from Freedomland U.S.A., after that park closed in 1964.

See also

Other locations with historic trains in a non-historic setting:
Pioneer Park (Fairbanks, Alaska)
Rail transport in Walt Disney Parks and Resorts

References

External links

Heritage railroads in New Hampshire
Lincoln, New Hampshire
Railroads of amusement parks in the United States
Railway lines opened in 1958
Transportation in Grafton County, New Hampshire
Tourist attractions in Grafton County, New Hampshire